Morehouse Parish is a parish located in the U.S. state of Louisiana. As of the 2020 census, the population was 25,629. The parish seat is Bastrop. The parish was formed in 1844.

Morehouse Parish comprises the Bastrop, LA Micropolitan Statistical Area, which is included in the Monroe–Ruston–Bastrop, LA Combined Statistical Area.

History
Francois Bonaventure built a house on 2000~acre tract in 1775 in Bastrop, Louisiana.

Morehouse Parish is named after Colonel Abraham Morehouse, who served in the Revolutionary War.

Throughout the first half of the twentieth century, Morehouse County was a stronghold of the Ku Klux Klan. During the trial for the 1922 Lynchings of Mer Rouge, Louisiana, many witnesses testified that county officials including Sheriff Fred Carpenter, his deputies, the district attorney, and the postmaster were Klan members. However the grand jury, itself likely made up largely of Klan members, dismissed the case.

Geography

Major highways
  U.S. Highway 165
  U.S. Highway 425
  Louisiana Highway 2
  Louisiana Highway 133
  Louisiana Highway 134

Adjacent counties and parishes
 Union County, Arkansas (northwest)
 Ashley County, Arkansas (north)
 Chicot County, Arkansas (northeast)
 West Carroll Parish (east)
 Richland Parish (southeast)
 Ouachita Parish (southwest)
 Union Parish (west)

National protected areas
 Handy Brake National Wildlife Refuge
 Upper Ouachita National Wildlife Refuge (part)

Demographics

2020 census

As of the 2020 United States census, there were 25,629 people, 9,732 households, and 6,194 families residing in the parish.

2010 census
As of the 2010 United States Census, there were 27,979 people living in the parish. 51.3% were White, 46.9% Black or African American, 0.4% Asian, 0.1% Native American, 0.1% Pacific Islander, 0.3% of some other race and 1.0% of two or more races. 0.9% were Hispanic or Latino (of any race).

2000 census
As of the census of 2000, there were 31,021 people, 11,382 households, and 8,320 families living in the parish.  The population density was 39 people per square mile (15/km2).  There were 12,711 housing units at an average density of 16 per square mile (6/km2).  The racial makeup of the parish was 55.76% White, 43.36% Black or African American, 0.13% Native American, 0.18% Asian, 0.01% Pacific Islander, 0.12% from other races, and 0.44% from two or more races.  0.74% of the population were Hispanic or Latino of any race.

There were 11,382 households, out of which 33.30% had children under the age of 18 living with them, 49.10% were married couples living together, 19.80% had a female householder with no husband present, and 26.90% were non-families. 24.40% of all households were made up of individuals, and 11.60% had someone living alone who was 65 years of age or older. The average household size was 2.64 and the average family size was 3.14.

In the parish the population was spread out, with 27.50% under the age of 18, 9.50% from 18 to 24, 26.40% from 25 to 44, 21.40% from 45 to 64, and 15.10% who were 65 years of age or older. The median age was 36 years. For every 100 females there were 91.40 males.  For every 100 females age 18 and over, there were 86.10 males.

The median income for a household in the parish was $25,124, and the median income for a family was $31,358. Males had a median income of $31,385 versus $18,474 for females. The per capita income for the parish was $13,197. About 21.30% of families and 26.80% of the population were below the poverty line, including 35.90% of those under age 18 and 23.80% of those age 65 or over.

Law enforcement

The Morehouse Parish Sheriff's Office (MPSO) is the primary law enforcement agency of Morehouse Parish. It falls under the authority of the Sheriff, who is the chief law enforcement officer of the parish.  the sheriff of Morehouse Parish is Mike Tubbs.

The Sheriff's Office operates the following facilities:

Headquarters - The headquarters building is located at 351 South Franklin Street in Bastrop.
Morehouse Parish Jail - The Morehouse Parish Jail is located at 250 East Walnut Street in Bastrop. The jail presently houses approximately 70 inmates, and employs twenty full-time and part-time Corrections Officers.
Morehouse Parish Detention Center - The Morehouse Parish Detention Center is located at 6444 Patey Road in Collinston. The Detention Center presently houses approximately 272 inmates, and employs thirty three Correction Officers.

Since the formation of the Morehouse Parish Sheriff's Office, one deputy has been killed in the line of duty.

Politics
In 1975, Edwards Barham, a farmer and businessman from Oak Ridge in Morehouse Parish, became the first Republican elected to the Louisiana State Senate since the era of Reconstruction. Barham won his seat by eighty-nine votes. He was unseated after a single term in office in 1979 by the Democrat David 'Bo' Ginn of Bastrop.

In the 2012 U.S. presidential election, Morehouse Parish cast 6,591 votes (52.3 percent) for Republican nominee Mitt Romney. U.S. President Barack Obama trailed with 5,888 ballots (46.7 percent). In 2008, Republican John McCain prevailed in Morehouse Parish with 7,258 votes (55 percent) to Barack Obama's 5,792 ballots (43.9 percent).

Education
Morehouse Parish School Board operates local public schools.

National Guard
The 1023rd Engineer Company (Vertical) of the 528th Engineer Battalion of the 225th Engineer Brigade is located in Bastrop.

Communities

City 
 Bastrop (parish seat and largest municipality)

Villages 
 Bonita
 Collinston
 Mer Rouge
 Oak Ridge

See also

 National Register of Historic Places listings in Morehouse Parish, Louisiana

References

 
Louisiana parishes
1844 establishments in Louisiana
Populated places established in 1844
Majority-minority parishes in Louisiana